In category theory, two categories C and D are isomorphic if there exist functors F : C → D and G : D → C which are mutually inverse to each other, i.e. FG = 1D (the identity functor on D) and GF = 1C. This means that both the objects and the morphisms of C and D stand in a one-to-one correspondence to each other. Two isomorphic categories share all properties that are defined solely in terms of category theory; for all practical purposes, they are identical and differ only in the notation of their objects and morphisms.

Isomorphism of categories is a very strong condition and rarely satisfied in practice.

Properties
As is true for any notion of isomorphism, we have the following general properties formally similar to an equivalence relation:
 any category C is isomorphic to itself
 if C is isomorphic to D, then D is isomorphic to C
 if C is isomorphic to D and D is isomorphic to E, then C is isomorphic to E.

A functor F : C → D yields an isomorphism of categories if and only if it is bijective on objects and on morphism sets. This criterion can be convenient as it avoids the need to construct the inverse functor G.

Examples
  Consider a finite group G, a field k and the group algebra kG. The category of k-linear group representations of G is isomorphic to the category of left modules over kG. The isomorphism can be described as follows: given a group representation ρ : G → GL(V), where V is a vector space over k, GL(V) is the group of its k-linear automorphisms, and ρ is a group homomorphism, we turn V into a left kG module by defining  for every v in V and every element Σ ag g in kG.  Conversely, given a left kG module M, then M is a k vector space, and multiplication with an element g of G yields a k-linear automorphism of M (since g is invertible in kG), which describes a group homomorphism G → GL(M). (There are still several things to check: both these assignments are functors, i.e. they can be applied to maps between group representations resp. kG modules, and they are inverse to each other, both on objects and on morphisms). See also .
 Every ring can be viewed as a preadditive category with a single object. The functor category of all additive functors from this category to the category of abelian groups is isomorphic to the category of left modules over the ring.
 Another isomorphism of categories arises in the theory of Boolean algebras: the category of Boolean algebras is isomorphic to the category of Boolean rings. Given a Boolean algebra B, we turn B into a Boolean ring by using the symmetric difference as addition and the meet operation  as multiplication. Conversely, given a Boolean ring R, we define the join operation by ab =  a + b + ab, and the meet operation as multiplication. Again, both of these assignments can be extended to morphisms to yield functors, and these functors are inverse to each other.
 If C is a category with an initial object s, then the slice category (s↓C) is isomorphic to C. Dually, if t is a terminal object in C, the functor category (C↓t) is isomorphic to C. Similarly, if 1 is the category with one object and only its identity morphism (in fact, 1 is the terminal category), and C is any category, then the functor category C1, with objects functors c: 1 → C, selecting an object c∈Ob(C), and arrows natural transformations f: c → d between these functors, selecting a morphism f: c → d in C, is again isomorphic to C.

See also 

 Equivalence of categories

References 

Adjoint functors
Equivalence (mathematics)